Trinity United Methodist Church, the first church in Lafayette, Indiana, was established in 1824, before the city was founded. The first meetings were held in the old log courthouse; the church was formally organized in 1827 with ten members. Trinity United Methodist is located at 314 North Sixth Street in Lafayette, Indiana 47901.

History
While traveling on the Crawfordsville Circuit, a Methodist circuit riding preacher named Eli P. Farmer organized in 1824 the first church in Lafayette, Indiana, which became the present-day Trinity United Methodist Church.

In 1830, the first church building was built on Sixth Street for $1,500. In 1836, the church moved to the northwest corner of Fifth and Ferry streets. They worshiped there until 1845 when they moved into a building along Fifth Street.

Lot #140 at Sixth and North streets was purchased in 1868 for $7,000. The Chapel (now the portion of the current building that contains the Parlor) was completed in 1869; the Sanctuary was completed in 1873 and was formally dedicated on March 23, 1873. The cost for the building was $90,000. In 1869, the church was officially given the name Trinity, as other Methodist churches were being established in the community.

Trinity's stained glass windows were designed by Edna Browning Ruby, a world-famous artist from Lafayette. She also made stained glass windows for area churches, including Stidham United Methodist Church and Elston Presbyterian Church.

One of the biggest changes to the church building was the installation of the basement in the 1930s. In 1933, the Homebuilders Sunday school class volunteered to enlarge the basement. By hand-digging the entire area of the current basement and carrying out the dirt in buckets, they created the space that now houses the Fellowship Hall, the Friendship Room and the kitchen. Numerous upgrades, remodeling and building projects have happened at the church since then.

Current usage
The church's mission statement is as follows: "To make disciples of Jesus Christ for the transformation of the world." Trinity's visions statement is, "Growing in love and service through relationships with God and community." Trinity is a Welcoming and Reconciling Congregation and part of the Reconciling Ministries Network. Trinity works towards its mission and vision by offering opportunities to worship, learn, and serve. Trinity offers a blended style of worship, including traditional hymns led by a pipe organ and contemporary choruses led from the piano. The preaching is centered on scripture and offers practical guidance for daily living. Worship services are every Sunday at 10:30 am. Trinity has classes for children, youth, and adults that meet on Sunday mornings at 9:15 am. There are also small group opportunities throughout the year. Trinity is a downtown church that works to serve the greater Lafayette community through a monthly mission focus and regular opportunities to volunteer with a variety of social services. Trinity is also a popular wedding venue.

See also
 Centennial Neighborhood District

References

External links
Official website

Churches in Lafayette, Indiana
Methodist churches in Indiana
Historic district contributing properties in Indiana
Churches completed in 1873
Churches on the National Register of Historic Places in Indiana
Religious organizations established in 1827
1827 establishments in Indiana
National Register of Historic Places in Tippecanoe County, Indiana